Abhay Raghunath Karve PVSM, AVSM is a retired Indian Navy Vice Admiral. He last served as the 27th Flag Officer Commanding-in-Chief Southern Naval Command. He retired on 30 July 2018 and was succeeded by Vice Admiral Anil Kumar Chawla.

Education
Karve did his undergraduate studies at National Defence Academy, Khadakvasla. He is a graduate of Defence Services Staff College (DSSC) Wellington, Ooty, and has undergone the Naval Higher Command Course from College of Naval Warfare at Mumbai. He is also a post graduate in National Security and Strategy from the National Defense University, Washington DC (USA).

Career
Karve joined the Indian Navy on 1 July 80, specializing in Anti-Submarine Warfare in 1986 and has commanded the aircraft carrier INS Viraat as well as the guided missile destroyer INS Ranvijay, the frigate INS Dunagiri and the ASW patrol vessel INS Ajay. In 2015 he was appointed Chief of Personnel.

Karve has been awarded the Ati Vishist Seva Medal in 2013  and the Param Vishisht Seva Medal in 2018.

Honours and awards

Military awards

References

Living people
Indian Navy admirals
Flag Officers Commanding Western Fleet
Recipients of the Ati Vishisht Seva Medal
National Defense University alumni
Recipients of the Param Vishisht Seva Medal
Year of birth missing (living people)
Chiefs of Personnel (India)
Defence Services Staff College alumni